Olavi "Olli" Huttunen (born 4 August 1960) is a Finnish football coach and former goalkeeper. He is the former head coach of the Finnish national team.

Considered one of the best Finnish goalkeepers of all time, Huttunen represented Haka all of his career, winning one Finnish championship and three Finnish Cups with the club. He earned 61 caps for Finland.

Huttunen started his coaching career as Keith Armstrong's assistant at Haka. He became Haka's head coach in 2002, and has led the club to one league championship and two cups. In 2009 Huttunen was sacked.

On 8 November 2010 he replaced Stuart Baxter as the head coach on Finland's national team for the match against San Marino.

Honours

As player
Finnish Championship: 1995
Finnish Cup: 1982, 1985, 1988
Finnish Footballer of the Year: 1982, 1984

As assistant coach
Finnish Championship: 1998, 1999, 2000
Finnish Cup: 1997

As head coach
Finnish Championship: 2004
Finnish Cup: 2002, 2005

References

1960 births
Living people
People from Kajaani
Finnish footballers
Finland international footballers
Finnish football managers
Association football goalkeepers
FC Haka players
Mestaruussarja players
Finland national football team managers
FC Haka managers
Sportspeople from Kainuu